Madan Kalita (1952 - 2022) was an Indian politician hailing from Nalbari, Assam. Kalita was elected as a legislator of the Assam Legislative Assembly from Nalbari Assembly constituency in 2001.

Kalita was denied as a candidate by the Indian National Congress in 2006, and contested in Assam assembly elections in 2006 and 2011 but lost to opponent candidate.

Kalita died on 21 January 2022 following a cardiac arrest.

References 

1952 births
2022 deaths
Assam MLAs 2001–2006
People from Nalbari
Indian National Congress politicians from Assam